The 1848 United States presidential election in Virginia took place on November 7, 1848, as part of the 1848 United States presidential election. Voters chose 17 representatives, or electors to the Electoral College, who voted for President and Vice President.

Virginia was a closely contested state during this election and narrowly voted for the Democratic candidate, former U.S. Senator Lewis Cass over the Whig candidate, military general Zachary Taylor. Cass won the state with a margin of 1.6%. As of 2020, this is the last election in which Morgan County, now part of West Virginia, voted for the Democratic candidate.

Results

References

Virginia
1848
1848 Virginia elections